Thomas Spinelly was Henry VIII of England’s representative in the Low Countries in 1510  and to Spain in 1517–8.

References

15th-century births
16th-century deaths
English diplomats
16th-century English diplomats
Ambassadors of England to the Netherlands